Pei Lisheng (October 31, 1906 – March 18, 2000) was a People's Republic of China politician. He was born in Yuanqu County, Shanxi Province. He was a graduate of Tsinghua University. He was twice governor of his home province (September 1950 – February 1951, May 1952 – April 1956). He was a delegate to the 3rd National People's Congress and a member of the 5th and 6th Chinese People's Political Consultative Conference.

1906 births
2000 deaths
People's Republic of China politicians from Shanxi
Chinese Communist Party politicians from Shanxi
Governors of Shanxi
Tsinghua University alumni
Delegates to the 3rd National People's Congress
Members of the 5th Chinese People's Political Consultative Conference
Members of the 6th Chinese People's Political Consultative Conference
Politicians from Yuncheng